Kara is a meteorite crater in the Yugorsky Peninsula, Nenetsia, Russia.

Heavily eroded, it is presently  in diameter, though it is thought to be originally  before erosion. Its age is estimated to be 70.3 ± 2.2 million years old (Late Cretaceous). Impactite outcrops located on the Baydarata Gulf (Baydaratskaya) shore north-east of the crater imply that the original size of the crater could have been the 4th largest on Earth. The crater is not exposed at the surface.

It was formerly believed that these two sites were two separate craters and that they formed a twin impact structure from the Late Cretaceous. However, it seems that the Ust-Kara site does not exist as a separate site. Apparently, the suevite outcrops of the Ust-Kara impact structure are only a part of the Kara impact structure.

References

External links 
 Earth Impact Database
 The Kara Crater Size: Suevite layer outside the crater depression

Impact craters of Russia
Impact craters of the Arctic
Cretaceous impact craters
Landforms of Nenets Autonomous Okrug
Landforms of Arkhangelsk Oblast